Realm, formerly Serial Box, is an American audio entertainment company that creates original fiction podcasts and audiobook series, which include continuations of TV series. Realm’s podcasts feature an array of production styles depending on the story, some with full casts, others with single voice narration. NPR described Realm as intending to serve as an "HBO for readers".

History
In September 2015, Julian Yap and Molly Barton launched Serial Box. The first production was Bookburners, created by Max Gladstone. The writing process was based on television serials rather than novels. Founder Yap realized that he was reading fewer novels due to time constraints from work. Both Yap and Barton believe that serialized fiction will make reading more accessible and social.

In April 2021, Serial Box changed its name to Realm and released its productions globally as podcasts. The productions can be listened to for free with advertising, or with a subscription.

Process
Realm hires a lead author, or showrunner, write a pilot episode and a "show bible" which will outline the plot for each season. After this, Realm brings together a team of writers who will contribute ideas in a manner similar to a television writers' room. At the end of this period, each author is assigned episodes to write. Whereas a novel generally takes 2–3 years to be written and published, a Realm production can be completed 6 months from the start date. Because the first episode is published before the season is completed, the authors can tailor the ending of the season to the audience's reactions. It is the responsibility of the showrunner to ensure that all episodes maintain a consistent writing style despite the involvement of multiple authors.

Awards
Molly Barton, Jeff Li, James Stuart, and Julian Yap were nominated for the 2019 World Fantasy Professional Award for their work with Serial Box.

Productions

References

Audiobook companies and organizations
Book publishing companies based in New York City
Fantasy book publishers
Science fiction publishers